The Bellanca TES (Tandem Experimental Sesquiplane) or Blue Streak was a push-pull sesquiplane aircraft designed by Giuseppe Mario Bellanca in 1929 for the first non-stop flight from Seattle to Tokyo.

In 1930 it was refitted with two 600 hp Curtiss Conqueror engines and reinforced for the Chicago Daily News as a cargo plane named The Blue Streak.
The aircraft crashed on 26 May, 1931 when the rear propeller driveshaft broke due to vibration and all four on board lost their lives.

Specifications (with Pratt & Whitney Wasp engines)

References

Bibliography 
 Alan Abel and Drina Welch Abel: Bellanca's Golden Age, Stockton : Wild Canyon Books, 2004,

External links 

 Page dedicated to Shirley J. Short
 Bellanca TES images from the archive of San Diego Air & Space Museum

TES
1920s United States experimental aircraft
Twin-engined push-pull aircraft
Aircraft first flown in 1929